Ansley is a surname. Notable people with the surname include:
Derrick Ansley, American football coach
Edwin P. Ansley (1865–1923), American real estate developer
Giselle Ansley (born 1992), English field hockey player
John Ansley (1774–1845), Lord Mayor of London
Josh Ansley, American musician
Mary Anne Ansley (fl. 1810–1840), English artist
Michael Ansley (born 1967), American basketball player
Ronald Ansley (1908–1965), Canadian politician
Sam Ansley (born ), American football player
Zachary Ansley (born 1972), Canadian actor

Fictional characters
Grace Ansley, a character in the short story "Roman Fever" by Edith Wharton